Andrew Johnson is a cross-country skier from the United States. He was born and raised in Greensboro, Vermont, and is a member of the U.S. 2006 Olympic Cross-Country Ski Team. He has been a Junior National Champ, an Overall "Supertour Champ", and a three-time All American. He is a four-time national champion, winning at the 2005 and 2006 championships, both held in Soldier Hollow, Utah.

After attending Middlebury College, Johnson signed with Madshus skis, Alpina boots, and Rottefella bindings. He is still skiing for these sponsors , as well as for the U.S. Ski Team, and ski wax and ski pole manufacturer Swix.

Johnson is currently the head Nordic ski coach at Middlebury.

References

External links
Andrew Johnson interview – At Alpina's website; including top sports merits
Sports-Reference Bio

American male cross-country skiers
Olympic cross-country skiers of the United States
Sportspeople from Vermont
People from Orleans County, Vermont
Cross-country skiers at the 2002 Winter Olympics
Cross-country skiers at the 2006 Winter Olympics
Middlebury College alumni
Living people
Year of birth missing (living people)